Camp Hill is a borough in Cumberland County, Pennsylvania, United States. The population was 7,888 at the 2010 census. There are many large corporations based in nearby East Pennsboro Township and Wormleysburg that use the Camp Hill postal address, including the Rite Aid Corporation, Harsco Corporation, and Gannett Fleming.

Geography
Camp Hill is located in eastern Cumberland County at  (40.241089, -76.926202). It is bordered to the east by the borough of Lemoyne, to the south by the Lower Allen census-designated place within Lower Allen Township, to the west by Hampden Township, and to the north by East Pennsboro Township.

U.S. Routes 11 and 15 run through the western and northern sides of the borough, while Pennsylvania Route 581, the Capital Beltway, passes through the southern side, intersecting US 11/15 at Exits 5A/5B.

It has a hot-summer humid continental climate (Dfa) with monthly averages ranging from 29.9° F in January to 74.8° F in July. The local hardiness zone is 7a.

Demographics

At the 2000 census, there were 7,636 people, 3,387 households and 2,157 families residing in the borough. The racial makeup of the borough was 96.08% White, 2.25% Asian, 0.35% African American, 0.16% Native American, 0.01% Pacific Islander, 0.25% from other races, and 0.89% from two or more races. Hispanic or Latino of any race were 1.09% of the population.

There were 3,387 households, of which 25.8% had children under the age of 18 living with them, 53.5% were married couples living together, 7.7% had a female householder with no husband present, and 36.3% were non-families. 32.2% of all households were made up of individuals, and 15.4% had someone living alone who was 65 years of age or older. The average household size was 2.21 and the average family size was 2.80.

21.3% of the population were under the age of 18, 4.5% from 18 to 24, 26.4% from 25 to 44, 25.0% from 45 to 64, and 22.7% who were 65 years of age or older. The median age was 43 years. For every 100 females, there were 88.5 males. For every 100 females age 18 and over, there were 83.5 males.

The median household income was $50,774 and the median family income was $61,578. Males had a median income of $48,625, and $32,357 for females. The per capita income for the borough was $28,256. About 3.6% of families and 3.7% of the population were below the poverty line, including 5.5% of those under age 18 and 4.4% of those age 65 or over.

History 
The name "Camp Hill" is believed to stem from a split in the congregation of a Peace Church, located west of the current borough. One faction of the church began meeting outdoors, on a hill. Prior to the Civil War, the area was known locally as White Hill, and was a stop along the Cumberland Valley Railroad between Harrisburg and Carlisle. During the Civil War, the Battle of Sporting Hill became the northernmost engagement of the Gettysburg Campaign, which took place at Camp Hill in late June 1863. Camp Hill was incorporated as a borough on November 10, 1885, from East Pennsboro Township. The Peace Church was added to the National Register of Historic Places in 1972.

Healthcare
Penn State Holy Spirit, a 326-bed non-profit Catholic community hospital is located in Camp Hill and serves as the primary facility for its related health system. The hospital was founded in 1963 and is sponsored by the Sisters of Christian Charity.

Government and infrastructure
State Correctional Institution - Camp Hill is located in nearby Lower Allen Township, and the township formerly had the headquarters of the Pennsylvania Department of Corrections.

Economy
Rite Aid has its national headquarters in nearby East Pennsboro Township and uses a Camp Hill postal address.

The Warrell Corporation is a confectionery manufacturing company based in Camp Hill.

Ames True Temper is a multinational corporation headquartered in Camp Hill.

Education
The borough of Camp Hill is served by the Camp Hill School District which provides education beginning with half-day kindergarten through twelfth grade. Camp Hill High School serves students from the borough school district. Three other high schools are located in the surrounding community. Cedar Cliff High School, part of the West Shore School District, is located in nearby Lower Allen Township and uses a Camp Hill postal address. Trinity High School is a parish-driven Catholic high school administered by the Roman Catholic Diocese of Harrisburg. Within the Camp Hill postal address are also students from the Cumberland Valley School District, with Cumberland Valley High School located in nearby Silver Spring Township.

Notable people

 Charlie Adams, former professional American football player
 Kyle Brady, former professional American football player for the New York Jets, Jacksonville Jaguars and New England Patriots
 Margaret Carlson, journalist and columnist
Kenneth J. Dunkley (born 1939) American inventor, and President of Holospace Laboratories Inc. located in Camp Hill. 
 Charles Eisenstein, writer
 Jeffrey Lord, political commentator on CNN who was a political director in the former Reagan administration
 William Daniel Phillips, winner of the 1997 Nobel Prize in physics
 Coy Wire, former professional American football player for the Buffalo Bills and Atlanta Falcons, Fox Sports studio analyst
 Jacque Fetrow, computational biochemist, president of Albright College
 Shea Quinn, guitarist and vocalist, The Sharks, an American new wave band

In popular culture
In Harry Turtledove's American Civil War alternate history series of novels, unofficially titled Southern Victory, Camp Hill is the site of a decisive battle in 1862. In the novels, General Lee's victory at the battle helped to end the War of Secession, granting the Confederacy full independence from the United States.

References

External links

 
 Borough of Camp Hill official website

 
Populated places established in 1750
Boroughs in Cumberland County, Pennsylvania
1750 establishments in Pennsylvania